Smith Mills is an unincorporated community and coal town in Henderson County, Kentucky, United States. Their post office opened in May 1820.

John Miller Cooper was born in Smith Mills.

References

Unincorporated communities in Henderson County, Kentucky
Unincorporated communities in Kentucky
Coal towns in Kentucky